The tenth and final season of Stargate SG-1, an American-Canadian television series, began airing on July 14, 2006 on Sci Fi Channel (United States). It concluded after 20 episodes on March 13, 2007 on Sky 1, which overtook the Sci-Fi Channel in mid-season. The series was developed by Brad Wright and Jonathan Glassner. Brad Wright, Robert C. Cooper, Joseph Mallozzi, and Paul Mullie served as executive producers. Season ten regular cast members include Ben Browder, Amanda Tapping, Christopher Judge, Claudia Black, Beau Bridges, and Michael Shanks.

The season (and the Ori arc of the show) is continued with direct-to-DVD film Stargate: The Ark of Truth.

Reception

Will O'Brien of TV Squad thought "Company of Thieves" was, for the most part, a good one, despite a disappointing performance by Rudolf Martin.  Jason Van Horn of IGN, however, was less than impressed, suggesting that the episode just wasn't interesting – that the Lucian Alliance was an enemy no one cares about and that Paul Emerson wasn't enough of a character within the show for his death to have had any meaningful impact.

The tenth and final season of Stargate SG-1 was nominated for a Saturn Award in the category "Best Syndicated/Cable Television Series". For his portrayal of Moros in "The Quest, Part 2", Matthew Walker was nominated for a Leo Award in the category "Best Supporting Performance by a Male in a Dramatic Series". The episode "200" was nominated for a Hugo Award in the category "Best Dramatic Presentation – Short Form".

Main cast

 Starring Ben Browder as Lt. Colonel Cameron Mitchell
 Amanda Tapping as Lt. Colonel Samantha Carter
 Christopher Judge as Teal'c
 Claudia Black as Vala Mal Doran
 With Beau Bridges as Major General Hank Landry
 And Michael Shanks as Dr. Daniel Jackson

Episodes

Episodes in bold are continuous episodes, where the story spans over 2 or more episodes.

Home releases

References

External links

 Season 10 on GateWorld
 Season 10 on IMDb
 Season 10 on TV.com
 

 10
2006 American television seasons
2007 American television seasons
SG-1 10
2006 Canadian television seasons
2007 Canadian television seasons